Saint-Martin-de-Lamps is a former commune in the Indre department in central France. On 1 January 2016, it was merged into the commune of Levroux.

Population

See also
Communes of the Indre department

References

Former communes of Indre